Pangandaran Regency is a Regency in West Java province, Indonesia, formed on 25 October 2012 out of the former southern portion of Ciamis Regency.  The population of this area as at the 2010 Census was 383,848, and was 423,670 at the 2020 Census; the official estimate as at mid 2021 was 428,242. The administrative capital is the town of Parigi.

Pangandaran Regency contains a beach called Pantai Pangandaran (Pangandaran Beach) and Cukang Taneuh Canyon (Green Canyon).

Administration 
The regency is divided into ten districts (kecamatan), tabulated below with their areas and their populations at the 2010 Census and 2020 Census, together with the official estimates for mid 2021. The table also includes the numbers of administrative villages (all classed as rural desa) in each district, and its post code(s).

Note: (a) except the villages of Ciganjeng (with a post code of 46372) and Sukanagara (with a post code of 46267).

Tourism
In 2011 Ciamis Regency was boosting the (new) tourist destinations with an idea of making a new Regency on the south of the '(virtual) isthmus' where there is also a tourist destination (Pangandaran Beach) as a cash cow. The tourist destinations are Situ Lengkong Panjalu, Kingdom of Sunda Astana Gede Kawali site and the most potential destination is Curug Tujuh, Cibolang, Panjalu. Curug Tujuh is located 2 kilometres from Cibolang main road. Curug Tujuh means "seven waterfalls", due to there being 7 waterfalls along a 5 kilometres track. The tallest waterfall is more than one hundred metres high.

Situ Lengkong Panjalu, 76.2 hectares has a small island in the centre of the lake called Nusa Gede where many East Javanese people come to visit King of Panjalu's son's cemetery.

In June 2011 the Tourism and Culture Ministry agreed to make the Pangandaran area into a National Tourism Site like Bali. It covers Karapyak Beach in Kalipucang District through Pangandaran Beach in Pangandaran district and to Batu Karas Beach in Cijulang District.

In 2010, Green Canyon was visited by 125,000 visitors and in 2011 by 150,000 visitors. On holiday there were more than 2,000 visitors per day made increase of boat waiting time due to narrow access to Green Canyon and the boat should wait for them who swam.

A number of artistic and tourist attractions attract visitors.

References

 
2012 establishments in Indonesia